Returned: Child Soldiers of Nepal's Maoist Army is a 2008 documentary film directed by American filmmaker Robert Koenig, and written by Robert Koenig and Brandon Kohrt. The documentary premiered in Hollywood, CA at Grauman's Egyptian Theatre in 2008 at the 5th Annual Artivist Film Festival, where it won the Artivist Award for Children's Advocacy. Returned also won the award for Best Documentary Short at the Atlanta Underground Film Festival that same year.

Synopsis

Returned: Child Soldiers of Nepal's Maoist Army tells the personal story of Nepali boys and girls as they attempt to rebuild their lives after fighting in the Nepalese Civil War. Through the voices of former child soldiers, the film examines why these children joined the Maoists and explores the prevention of future recruitment.

The children describe their dramatic recruitment and participation in the Maoist People’s Liberation Army during the eleven-year civil war between the Maoist insurgents and the Hindu monarch of Nepal. The girls’ stories demonstrate how voluntarily joining the violent Maoist struggle became their only option to escape the gender discrimination and sexual violence of traditional Hindu culture in Nepal. With the major conflict ended and the Maoists in control of the government, these children are now in United Nations cantonments, and return home to communities and families that want nothing to do with them. For many of the children of Nepal’s Maoist Army, the return home can be even more painful than the experience of war.

Accolades
"Best Short, Children's Advocacy" 5th Annual Artivist Film Festival, 2008
"Best Student Work" Society for Visual Anthropology Film Festival, 2008
"Best Documentary Short" Atlanta Underground Film Festival, 2008
CARE Film Festival, Johannesburg, South Africa, 2008
Himalayan Film Festival, Amsterdam, 2009
Document 7 - International Human Rights Documentary Film Festival, Scotland, 2009
United States National Academy of Sciences Institute of Medicine
Days of Ethnographic Film, Moscow, Russia, 2009
Association for Asian Studies Annual Meeting, Philadelphia, PA, 2010
Anthropology Film Festival at UBC, Vancouver, Canada, 2010

See also
Military use of children
Unified Communist Party of Nepal (Maoist)
Prachanda

References

External links
 
 
  DER Documentary: Returned: Child Soldiers of Nepal's Maoist Army

Documentary films about Nepal
Documentary films about child soldiers
Films about communism
2008 documentary films
2008 films
American documentary films
History of Nepal
Maoism in Nepal
Nepalese Civil War films
2000s English-language films
2000s American films